Carnie Smith Stadium (formerly Brandenburg Stadium) is the football stadium for Pittsburg State University in Pittsburg, Kansas.  The stadium is nicknamed "The Jungle" (after the school's mascot, the gorilla), or "The Pitt."

History
Built in 1923, the stadium was originally named for the college's first president, William Aaron Brandenburg.  In 1987, it was renamed for Carnie Smith who led the school to NAIA National Football Championships in 1957 and 1961.  The playing surface is still named Brandenburg Field.  The school extensively renovated the stadium in 2000 ($5.8 million overhaul), in 2006 ($2.5 million renovation to the west end, including the addition of eight luxury boxes, and in 2008 ($1.7 million addition of a video board, the largest in NCAA Division II).

Unlike most Division II stadiums, there is an auxiliary game clock installed in the north end zone, meaning teams driving in that direction no longer need to turn around to the main scoreboard in the south end.

Attendance
Average attendance at football games in the stadium since 2000 has been around 7,800.  A 2001 game against Northwest Missouri State University drew a then record attendance of 11,862, prompting Pittsburg State to play future games at Arrowhead Stadium in Kansas City with more than 26,000 attending a game in 2002, a Division II record.

During the 2012 football season, the Gorillas packed more than 10,000 or more fans into Carnie Smith Stadium three times, including a season-high 11,910 fans for Homecoming on Oct. 20 – the largest home crowd in school history.  The stadium averaged 10,055 fans per game (126% capacity) during the 2012 season.

Other uses
The stadium has been the home to numerous Kansas State High School Activities Association state championship games, home games for Pittsburg High School and St. Mary's Colgan High School, and is currently in the rotation for the Kansas Shrine Bowl all-star game with Emporia, Wichita and Hays. From 2018-2020, it is also the host site for the National Junior College National Football Championship.

References

External links
Official site

Pittsburg State Gorillas football
College football venues
Sports venues in Kansas
Buildings and structures in Pittsburg, Kansas
Sports venues completed in 1924
1924 establishments in Kansas
American football venues in Kansas